Nemasomatidae is a family of millipedes in the order Julida.

Ameractis
Antrokoreana 
Basoncopus 
Dasynemasoma 
Heterisobates 
Lavabates 
Nemasoma 
Orinisobates 
Sinostemmiulus 
Thalassisobates

References

Julida
Taxa named by Charles Harvey Bollman
Millipede families